Alepidomus evermanni is a freshwater species of silverside endemic to western Cuba. It is the only known member of its genus. This species was described as Atherina evermanni by Carl H. Eigenmann in 1903 with a type locality of San Cristobal, Cuba. The specific name honours the American ichthyologist Barton Warren Evermann (1853-1932).

References

Atherinomorinae
Monotypic fish genera
Freshwater fish of Cuba
Endemic fauna of Cuba